Thrybergh Junction was a junction on the South Yorkshire Railway, Mexborough to Rotherham line situated about 1 mile south of Kilnhurst Central. The junction was originally controlled by a Manchester, Sheffield and Lincolnshire Railway signal box of the earliest design, almost square with a hipped roof built on stilts. The junction was originally known as Thrybergh Hall Junction and served the line to  Kilnhurst Colliery, brickworks and another colliery interest at Warren Vale.

On the sinking of Silverwood Colliery this became the junction for the Silverwood Branch, a short curve which joined the Great Central to John Brown's Private Railway, a line which linked the colliery to a riverside boat staithe and John Browns other colliery interests in the Parkgate area.

The M.S.& L.R. signal box was always in a difficult position being built into the bank of the nearby River Don. The box, around 1920, eventually fell backwards into the river and a replacement was sought. This was found in an almost new cabin, from York Road, Doncaster, which was moved and erected on the site.

References

Rail transport in South Yorkshire
Great Central Railway
Rail junctions in England